The Rubicon is a small river in Northern Italy.

River Rubicon or Rubicon River may also refer to:
Rubicon (Belgium), a tributary of the river Amblève
Rubicon River (California), a tributary of the American River in California, United States
Rubicon River (New Zealand), in the South Island of New Zealand
Rubicon River (Tasmania), a river in Tasmania, Australia
Rubicon River (Victoria), a river in Victoria, Australia
Rubicon River (Wisconsin), a river in Wisconsin, United States

See also:
Rubicon (disambiguation)
Crossing the Rubicon (disambiguation)